Aleksandr Stanislavovich Korotayev (born 15 July 1992) is a Russian professional football player. He plays for FC Tyumen.

Club career
He made his Russian Football National League debut for FC Rotor Volgograd on 11 March 2013 in a game against FC Neftekhimik Nizhnekamsk.

External links
 
 Profile by FNL

1992 births
Sportspeople from Izhevsk
Living people
Russian footballers
Association football forwards
Russia youth international footballers
Russia under-21 international footballers
FC Rotor Volgograd players
FC Sokol Saratov players
FC Yenisey Krasnoyarsk players
FC Dynamo Saint Petersburg players
FC Tyumen players
FC Chayka Peschanokopskoye players
FC Olimp-Dolgoprudny players